Attappady (HQ:Agali) is a tribal taluk in Kerala state covering an area of . It is carved out from Mannarkkad taluk in Palakkad district on February 2021. Attappady Reserve Forest is a protected area comprising 249 km2 of land area in the western parts of Attappady.<ref>Suchitra M.(8/8/2005) "Remote adivasis face health care chasm" Free India Media, retrieved 4/3/2007 [http://www.freeindiamedia.com/health/08_aug_05_health1.htm "Remote adivasis..."] </ref> It is one among the reserved forests and protected forests of India. Attappadi valley in Palakkad district along with the neighbouring Chaliyar valley of the Nilambur region (Eastern Eranad region) in Malappuram district, is known for natural Gold fields, which is also seen in the other regions of Nilgiri Biosphere Reserve.

History
Mannarkkad and Attappadi were parts of Valluvanad Swaroopam dynasty in the medieval period with their headquarters at Angadipuram near Perinthalmanna in the present-day Malappuram district. According to local legends, the last Cheraman Perumal ruler gave a vast extension of land in South Malabar during his journey to Mecca to one of their governors, Valluvakonathiri'', and left for pilgrimage. Valluvanad was famous for the Mamankam festivals at Tirunavaya, held once in 12 years and the endless wars against the Zamorin of Calicut.

During the last decades of the eighteenth century, the region came under the control of the vast Kingdom of Mysore. Under British Raj, it was a part of Valluvanad Taluk of Malappuram Revenue Division in Malabar District. Perinthalmanna was the headquarters of the Old Walluvanad Taluk in the British Malabar District. Mannarkkad, along with the towns of Perinthalmanna, Malappuram, Manjeri, and Tirurangadi, was one of the main centres of the Malabar Rebellion of 1921.

Walluvanad Taluk was divided into six Revenue blocks: Mankada, Perinthalmanna, Mannarkkad, Ottapalam, Sreekrishnapuram, and Pattambi. Walluvanad was one of the two Taluks included in the Malappuram Revenue Division (the other being Eranad Taluk) of British Malabar. On 1 November 1957, the Walluvanad Taluk was divided into two: Perinthalmanna Taluk and Ottapalam Taluk. The Revenue blocks of Mankada, Perinthalmanna, and Mannarkkad were included in the Perinthalmanna Taluk, while Ottapalam, Sreekrishnapuram, and Pattambi were transferred to the newly formed Ottapalam Taluk. Later Attappadi Revenue block was separated from Mannarkkad Block. 
During the formation of Malappuram district on 16 June 1969, the Revenue blocks of Mannarkkad and Attappadi were separated from Perinthalmanna Taluk to form Mannarkkad Taluk.

Later some years, a portion of Karuvarakundu village in Eranad Taluk (now Karuvarakundu is a part of Nilambur Taluk) of Malappuram district was transferred to the Silent Valley area of Attappadi. In February 2021, Attappady tribal taluk formed by carving out from Mannarkkad taluk.

Geography

Attappady is an extensive mountain valley at the headwaters of the Bhavani River nestled below the Nilgiri Hills of the Western Ghats. It is bordered to the east by Coimbatore district in Tamil Nadu, on the north by the Nilgiris, south by the Palakkad taluk, and on the west by Karimba-I and II, Pottassery-I and II, and Mannarghat revenue villages of Mannarghat taluk of the Palghat District and Ernad taluk of the Malappuram district.

The 249 km2 Attappady Reserve Forest is an informal buffer zone bordering the Silent Valley National Park to the West. 81 km2 of this forest was separated to become most of the new 94 km2 Bhavani Forest Range which is part of the 147.22 km2 Silent Valley Buffer Zone formally approved by the Kerala Cabinet on 6 June 2007. The Cabinet also sanctioned 35 staff to protect the area and two new forest stations in the Bhavani range at Anavai and Thudukki. The zone is aimed at checking the illicit cultivation of ganja (cannabis), poaching, and illicit brewing in areas adjacent to Silent Valley and help long-term sustainability of the protected area.

The Bhavani River flows from the Northwest around the mountain in a tight bend past Attappady village and continues to the Southeast.

Silent Valley National Park

It is located in the rich biodiversity of Nilgiri Biosphere Reserve. Karimpuzha Wildlife Sanctuary, New Amarambalam Reserved Forest, and Nedumkayam Rainforest in Nilambur Taluk of Malappuram district, Attappadi Reserved Forest in Mannarkkad Taluk of Palakkad district, and Mukurthi National Park of Nilgiris district, are located around Silent Valley National Park. Mukurthi peak, the fifth-highest peak in South India, and Anginda peak are also located in its vicinity. Bhavani River, a tributary of Kaveri River, and Kunthipuzha River, a tributary of Bharathappuzha river, originating in the vicinity of Silent Valley. The Kadalundi River has also its origin in Silent Valley.

Geology
Gneisses are the predominant rocks in Attappady. All rock types of Attappady other than supracrustals could be categorized into seven broad types. They are charnockite, hornblende gneiss, migmatitic amphibolite, quartz biotite gneiss, quartz-feldspathic gneiss, biotite granite gneiss, and pegmatite. Among the rock types charnockite, hornblende gneiss, migmatitic amphibolite, quartz biotite gneiss, quartz-feldspathic gneiss, and biotite granite gneiss have been identified that belong to the Peninsular Gneissic Complex. The granite and pegmatite of Attappady represent the post-kinematic intrusives. Many dolerite dykes also have been reported in this area. The bands and layers of ultramafics and mafic rocks (Ultramafic and mafic rocks represented by meta pyroxenite, talc-tremolite-actinolite schist, and amphibolites) of varying dimensions, banded iron formation(BIF), sillimanite/kyanite bearing quartzite and fuchsite quartzite occurring within the Peninsular Gneissic Complex of Attappady area designated as Attappady Supracrustals. Remnants and enclaves of Attappady supracrustals occur within the gneisses. BIF is another important rock type occurring in close association with the meta pyroxenite and amphibolites.

Attappady is unique in that a number of rock types varying in composition from ultramafic to metapelites occur as supracrustals. The metapelites are of granulite facies and the ultramafics are of greenschist facies and the enclosing gneisses represent amphibolites facies.

The area had undergone polyphase deformation. The planar S0 is defined by the layering within chromogenic precipitate (BIF). The earliest folds F1, apart from being tight and appressed occur in intrafamilial positions and also constitute the rootless folds. This folding has given rise to an axial planar penetrative foliation and is defined mainly by hornblende and to a lesser extent by chlorite and is co-parallel to the lithoboundaries identified as S0. S1 schistosity is defined by hornblende and chlorite, and this mineralogical association suggests that the deformation occurred under upper greenschist to lower amphibolite facies conditions. The subsequent F2 resulted in refolding of S1 and transposition of S1 subparallel to the F2 axial trace. The most prominent planar structures are the discrete mylonitic foliation S2 attributed to the regional NE-SW trending Bhavani shear. Mylonite development, biotitization, chlorination, and micro granulation are found associated with these surfaces.

Gold Mineralization
Mani 1965 reported the panning for gold by local miners in the Siruvani River of Attappady. Detailed studies to assess the economic potential of the Attappady area were carried out subsequently by the Geological Survey of India. However, no primary gold prospects were identified. Nair 1993 carried out the geomorphologic mapping combined with panning of Siruvani River which led to the discovery of primary gold mineralization in epigenetic quartz vein in Puttumala. The veining, mineralization, and associated lithology of this deposit appear to be typical of the greenstone-hosted lode gold deposit. On the basis of mode of occurrence, two types of gold mineralization are recognized in Attappady,
Primary gold mineralization is associated with quartz veins intruding to AS and PGC.
Placer deposit along the bank of Siruvani River.

The Geological Survey of India has confirmed the high gold-bearing potentiality of the rocks in the 834sq km area of the Attappady. Gold mineralization is known from Kottathara, Puttumala, Pothupadi, Mundaiyur, and Kariyur-Vannathorai Prospects of Attappady. Gold occurs in quartz veins traversing in BIF, metavolcanics, and hornblende and biotite gneiss. Deccan Gold Mines Limited later confirmed the earlier reported gold grades and has given the following values, Kottathara prospect: Three zones have been delineated and the prospect has ore resource of grading 13.63g/t gold according to the Geological Survey of India. While tracing the NE extension of the Kottathara prospect, stringers of quartz analyzing 9 g/t 35 g/t and 49g/t gold have been picked up in stream beds.
Puttumala prospect: A 60  cm sample of vein quartz carrying galena (lead sulfide) from old trenches showed high spot values of gold up to 21g/t.
Pothupadi Prospect: A sample of vein quartz traversing amphibolite assayed 4 g/t gold.
Mundaiyur Prospect: Gold occurs in quartz veins over a length of 300 m with gold-bearing sulfides enveloping the quartz veins.
Kariyur-Vannathorai Prospect: Samples of vein quartz have shown gold contents ranging from 3 to 20 g/t.

In Attappady, region gold grains are found only in the native state and occur in different shapes and sizes. Visible specks of gold were noticed in the samples collected from veins, particularly where the associated sulfides have been subjected to weathering and leaching resulting in the formation of limonite. Gold grains with a maximum dimension of 2 mm were reported. Pyrite is the dominant sulfide phase within the quartz lodes (occurring as stringers and fracture fillings). Chalcopyrite, covellite, chalcocite, and galena are commonly observed in the mineral assemblage.

Climate
Attappady RF in the southwest portion of Mannarghat Forest Division receives a high rainfall of 4700 mm (185 in). Moving eastward along the Attappady valley towards Agali, the rainfall steadily decreases to a low of 900 mm.

Administration
Attappady tribal taluk has administration over Attappady block panchayat, Agali, Sholayur and Pudur grama panchayats.

Constituent Villages
Attappady taluk comprises 6 revenue villages like Agali, Kallamala, Kottathara, Padavayal, Pudur and Sholayur.

Demographics
As of the 2011 census report, Attappady taluk/Attappady CD Block had a total population of 64,318 where 32,035 are males and 32,283 are females. The total number of households was 16,865. The population of children in the age group of 0-6 was 7,009 (10.9%) among which 3,551 are boys and 3,458 are girls.

The total number of literates in Attappady was 43,021 with an overall literacy rate of 75% which is lower than the state average of 94%. Male literacy stands at 80.2% and Female literacy at 70%.
Attappady taluk/CD Block had scheduled tribal population of 27,627 (43% of total population) where 13,708 were males and 13,919 were females.
 
The tribal population of the valley is mostly Muduga, Irula, Kurumba tribal people and a section of settlers from Other Districts of Kerala.

There are mainly three Communities of tribes living in Attapadi they are Irulas, Mudugas, and Kurumbas.

Kurumbas
(Kurumbar, Kurumban) Kurumbar is most primitive tribe. they are distributed in Attappady Block Panchayat of Palakkad District. They are the earliest inhabitants of the Attappady area and are called 'Palu Kurumba' to distinguish them from the 'Alu Kurumba' of Nilgiris in Tamil Nadu State. The language spoken by them is a mixture of Tamil and Malayalam. The traditional social organization of Kurumbar is
similar to that of Mudugar and Irular communities residing in that area. Kurumbar mostly living in Reserve and Vested Forest areas have been practicing shifting cultivation called 'Panja Krishi'. They cultivate Ragi, Thuvara, Chama, etc. They are experts in cattle rearing. They are also collectors of non-timber forest produces. They maintain a community life by sharing land and labor. Kurumbas were once hunters and gatherers and shifting cultivators of Attappady Valley. However, among the five PVTG of Kerala, the younger generation of the Kurumba community has shown more interest than others in organizing themselves and getting educated.  Now they are living in 19 'ooru'. Kurumba community is settled in Agali and Pudur Grama Panchayats of Palakkad District.
Thadikund
Thazhe Anavai
Mele Anavai
Kadukamanna
Murukala
Palappada
kinattikkara
Thudukki
Mele Thudukki
Galazy
Kurukkathikkallu
Gottiyarkandi
Anakkattiyur
Pazhur
Mele Bhoothayar
Thazhe Bhoothayar
Idavani
Mele Moolakombu
Ooradam.

There are 543 families with a population of 2251. The family size is 4.14. As the population consists of 1128 males and 1123 females the sex ratio is 1000:996. Ninety-eight percent of the Kurumba population is settled in Pudur Grama Panchayat and the rest in Agali Grama Panchayat.

Mudugar
As already mentioned Mudugar distributed in the Palakkad district is one of the three communities of the Attappady region. They have a distinct identity because of their traditional right to climb the Malleeswaran Peak and light the lamp on the 'Sivaratri' day. They have a dialect of their own known as 'Muduga Bhasha' Mudugar has the institutions of 'Ooru Moopan', (Headman)' Bhandari' (Treasurer),
'Kuruthalai' (Assistant) and 'Mannukaran' (soil expert). This system is similar to the traditional social organization of the other two tribal communities of Attappady, viz; Irular and Kurumbar. Modular practice settled agriculture with many features of shifting cultivation. They used to cultivate 'ragi', 'Chama', 'think' etc. They also collect non-timber forest produces. Their land has been alienated as they have little knowledge to secure documents relating to their possession. The working population among them has become agricultural laborers as
agriculture and animal husbandry, have slowly been changing as their subsidiary occupations. The community is pro-educative and inputs to agriculture can sustain their livelihood means. There are 1274 families and 4668 population in the Mudugar community. The population consists of 2225 males and 2443 females, registering the family size as 3.66 and a sex ratio of 1000: 1098. Modular community is settled in Palakkad District. In Pathanamthitta and Kannur Districts one family each of the Mudugar community has been identified. Modular community is distributed in 9 Grama Panchayats in Palakkad but the majority of them are
settled in Agali and Pudur Grama Panchayats in the Attappady region.

Irular, Irulan 
Irular community is distributed in Palakkad District and they are mainly concentrated in the Attappady region. They are also found in Tamil Nadu. They have a dialect of their own called 'Irula bhasha', which has more affinity to Tamil. Their traditional social organization is endowed with various functionaries, namely; 'Ooru Moopan' (Chieftain),' Bhandari' (Treasurer), 'Kuruthala' (assistant to Chieftain) 'Mannukaran' (soil expert), 'Marunnukaran' (healer), etc. These positions are hereditary and succession is by the son. These traditional institutions play a decisive role in the social
control mechanism of the Irular community. Earlier Irular were hunters, gatherers, and shifting cultivators. Now they have become experts in settled agriculture and also work as agricultural laborers. The major area in Attappady falls under the rain shadow region and as such the important crops raised by them under dry farming are 'Ragi', 'Chama', 'Thina', 'Cholam', 'Thuvara', 'Kadala' etc. For cultivation, they stay away from their hamlet and erect temporary huts. Irular community has attractive songs and dances which tell about their forest, cultivation, emotions, etc. They have been empowered through 'Thaikula Sangham', exclusively for women, and 'Ooruvikasana Samithi' organized under the Attappady Hills Area Development Society. Their livelihood means have been affected due to the influx of non-tribal 
Scheduled Tribes of Kerala: Report on the Socio-Economic Status Chapter 2: Demographic Features of Scheduled Tribes 10 population both from other parts of Kerala and Tamil Nadu. Technically, Irular community has representation in four districts, namely; Palakkad, Thiruvananthapuram, Idukki, and Malappuram.

There are 7617 families in the Irular community, of which 7614 are in Palakkad District and one each in the other three districts. The family size of the Irular community is 3.48 Irular population comes to 26,525. They have the credit of being the fifth largest community of Scheduled Tribes in Kerala. They constitute 6.22 percent of the Scheduled Tribes. In Palakkad, they are settled in 10 Grama Panchayats, with the concentration in the 3 Grama Panchayats of the Attappady region.

Approximately 95.20 percent of the Irular community is located in Agali (9474), Sholayur (9076), and Pudur (6703) Grama
Panchayats of Attappady.

Pudussery (907) and Malampuzha (245) are the other two Grama Panchayats with a sizable population of Irular community. Since the population consists of 13163 males and 13362 females, the sex ratio of the Irular community is 1000: 1015.

Infrastructure
The local governments of Attappady are the Agali, Pudur, and Sholayur Grama Panchayats.

Health
There are three government primary health centers (PHC), one community health center (CHC), and 28 subcentres in this 745-km2 block. All hamlets are serviced by an effective government health extension program using trained tribal health volunteers.

The best-equipped charitable multi-specialty hospital in the region is being run by Swami Vivekananda Medical Mission Hospital at Again. It is a 30-bed hospital with all advanced diagnostics and basic surgery facilities, ICU, neonatal care, etc., and all major disciplines such as gynecology & obstetrics, pediatric, skin, dental, ENT, etc. The hospital charges a very nominal fee for non-tribal patients which is a fraction of the commercial market rates. For tribal patients, all treatments whether out-patient or in-patient, procedures, tests, medicines, everything is for free. Investments in infrastructure are basically met by corporate social responsibility (CSR) support from companies. The operating expenses under charitable activities are funded through crowdfunding as well as through donations from philanthropists, well-wishers, etc.

https://en.wikipedia.org/wiki/File:SVMM_Hospital.jpg

The tribal women of 80 Attapadi hamlets are conducting a vocal campaign against liquor and ganja which has received public support from the Governor. The Society of the Missionaries of St. Thomas operates the St. Thomas Ashram in Nelippathy for providing services to the tribal people of Attapadi including a 15-bed Hospital and health clinic with Lab, X-ray, Dental X-ray, ECG, Pharmacy and ambulance.

Education
Only one government school in Agali is having the facilities of a fully equipped education center. A college of applied sciences (IHRD College) is started in Agali, in the year 2010 for higher education. Govt. College Attappady is the first Arts and Science College in the Attappady region established under the Govt. sector in 2012.

Since 2010, Swami Vivekananda Medical Mission has been running an Malleeswara Vidyanikethan School with classes up to Std 10 under affiliation from National Institute of Open Schooling (NIOS). The school operates under the management guidance of Bharatheeya Vidya Nikethan, Kerala. The school has 300+ students, a third of them tribals. Education is completely free for tribal students and non-tribals from poor backgrounds. The school operates from a 3-acre picturesque property and has 10 classrooms, a well-equipped library, a laboratory, a spacious playground, and a perennial water stream adjacent to it. The school has a bus facility for students. Apart from school, SVMM runs other skill-development programs such as Balachandran Smaraka Janavaibhava Kendram (micro-entrepreneur development programs), and Vivekananda Jana Sevana Kendram (computer education center).

Development projects
In 1970 the State Planning Board assessed Attappati as the most backward block in the state and the first Integrated Tribal Development Project in Kerala was initiated there. Since then, the state government has implemented several special development projects including the Attappady Co-operative Farming Society, the Western Ghats Development Programme, the Attappady Valley Irrigation Programme, and the People's Planning Programme implemented in Attappady in 1997–2002.

A monumental palace-like "Bharat Yatra Centre" at Agali was established in 1984 by a former Prime Minister, Chandra Shekhar, to provide employment training in weaving, pottery, embroidery, and food processing to the women of this rural area. The property was occasionally occupied personally by Chandra Shekar but employment training never happened. The leaders of Girijan Sevak Samaj (GSS), the major tribal body in Attappady, stated that the center was built on original tribal lands possessed illegally. In 2000 The Centre at Attappady and its huge building were deserted and unoccupied.

Many of these projects were not well adapted to traditional Adivasi culture and beliefs so about 80 percent of the tribal population is still living in abject poverty. Attappady demonstrates how difficult it is for a modern government development process to succeed in a traditional self-sustaining indigenous peoples (adivasi) community. Tribal people are a majority of the Attappady population but have a high illiteracy rate of 49.5 percent and a lack of political and administrative awareness. The majority of project managers and new land owners are from other parts of Kerala, Tamil Nadu, and other states.

The Attappady Comprehensive Environmental Conservation and Wasteland Development Project was established in 1995, with local operations managed from their Agali Headquarters. This project has Rs. 2.19 billion ($5,000,000) development assistance loan from the Japan Bank for International Cooperation (JBIC) and is implemented by the Attappady Hills Area Development Society. a state government agency. AHADS has made good quantified achievements that will bring long-term benefit to the valley.

Integrated Rural Technology Centre (IRTC), Palakkad is implementing the NABARD WADI Tribal development project in Attappady.

In 2004, Swami Vivekananda Medical Mission (SVMM), a charitable trust registered in Agaly Village started functioning in Attappady. SVMM was founded by Dr. V Narayanan, MBBS, DCH from Govt Medical College, Trivandrum as a charitable institution devoted to selfless service of tribal communities.

SVMM started its work as a mobile medical unit dispensing medicines to tribal hamlets. It has since grown into a comprehensive service organization with the following components:

(i) a 30-bed multi-specialty hospital in Agaly that provides free in-patient and out-patient medical treatment to tribals free of cost

(ii) an English medium school affiliated with the National Institute of Open Schooling (NIOS) that provides free education to tribals up to Std 10

(iii) a skill development center for tribals named Sri Balachandran Smaraka Janavaibhava Kendram that runs skill development and micro-entrepreneurship development programs in collaboration with Dept of MSME, Govt of India, NABARD, etc.

(iv) community outreach programs such as deploying trained Village Health Workers in all tribal hamlets, awareness campaigns, free health camps, immunization drives, mental health programs, alcohol de-addiction drives, sickle cell anemia programs, etc.

(v) empowerment programs for tribals such as Saraswati Samskruti Kendras where sanskaras are inculcated in children, Grama Samitis for developing problem-solving skills, and Farmers Committees where sustainable agriculture and new technological innovations are introduced.

In a span of 15 years, SVMM has been able to bring about a remarkable change in social health backed by grassroots empowerment and a sense of belonging in tribal communities.

Attappady Social Service Organisation (ASSO) is one of the major Social Service organizations functioning in Attappady. It successfully implemented World Bank-aided 'Jalanidhi' project to provide drinking water facilities for the tribal community.

Festival
The Sivarathri festival is celebrated at the chemmannur Malleswaran temple by the tribals during the month of February/March. The Malleswaram peak is worshipped as a gigantic Shivalinga by the Adivasis who celebrate the Sivarathri festival there with great fervor.

At the Ayyappan temple in Agali, Ayyappan Vilakku is celebrated in January.

The Vishu festival is celebrated at Pattimalam in Sree Vandikotti Mariyamma Thune Temple.

See also
P. R. G. Mathur

References

External links

Geography of Palakkad district
Reserved forests of India
Mountains of Kerala
Valleys of India
Tourist attractions in Palakkad district